Marmaronisi is a small uninhabited rock island on the northern side of Mykonos in the Cyclades. It is located at the entrance of the bay of Panormos and opposite the settlement of Agios Sostis. 

Marmaronisi is named for its composition of the rocks of the island, which is also suitable for manufacturing lime.

References

External links
Official website of Municipality of Mykonos 

Uninhabited islands of Greece
Cyclades
Landforms of Mykonos
Islands of the South Aegean